Pamela Coburn (born 29 March 1959) is an American operatic soprano. She has performed leading roles internationally, including regular performances at the Vienna State Opera, the Zurich Opera, the Metropolitan Opera, and the Salzburg Festival. She has also recorded with notable conductors, including Nikolaus Harnoncourt and Carlos Kleiber.

Career 
Born in Dayton, Ohio, Coburn grew up in Cincinnati where her mother was a piano teacher and a choral conductor. Coburn studied at DePauw University with Ed White, the Eastman School in Rochester, and the Juilliard School. She moved to Germany in 1980 and won the ARD International Music Competition the same year. She won the Metropolitan Opera National Council Auditions in 1982.

Her career was promoted by Elisabeth Schwarzkopf. She was a member of the Bavarian State Opera from 1982 to 1987 and often returned as a guest. She was  Rosalinde in Strauss' Die Fledermaus in a performance with this company which was captured on video.  At the Vienna State Opera, she appeared as Fiordiligi in Mozart's Così fan tutte, as the Countess in his Le nozze di Figaro, and as Ellen in Benjamin Britten's Peter Grimes, a role which she also performed at the Maggio Musicale Fiorentino and in Munich. She sang Pamina in Mozart's Die Zauberflöte at the municipal de Marseille|Opéra de Marseille (France) in 1988 and also appeared as the Countess at the Salzburg Festival in 1991 and at the Metropolitan Opera. Her roles have included Cleopatra in Handel's Giulio Cesare, Elvira in Mozart's Don Giovanni, Elettra in his Idomeneo, and the Marschallin in Der Rosenkavalier by Richard Strauss.

Coburn recorded Mozart's Die Zauberflöte, conducted by Nikolaus Harnoncourt in a production of the Zurich Opera. In 1990, she recorded Mozart's L'Oca del Cairo conducted by Peter Schreier. She has made many other recordings in both opera and concert.

References

External links 
 
 
 Pamela Coburn as Rosalinde "So muss allein ich bleiben..." ("Die Fledermaus") on YouTube

American operatic sopranos
1959 births
Living people
People from Dayton, Ohio
Indiana University alumni
Eastman School of Music alumni
Juilliard School alumni
Singers from Ohio
Classical musicians from Ohio
21st-century American women